Anne-Pascale Clairembourg (born 3 April 1975) is a Belgian stage and film actress.

Career 
Clairembourg became interested in acting at early age and enrolled the Institute of Arts in Brussels, where she graduated in 2000. She then began working in theater. In 2005 and 2007 she was nominated for the Prix du Théâtre in Belgium, which she won in 2014. She appeared in the critically acclaimed play Tristesses (2016), which received the Jury Prize at the 2016 Avignon Festival. She also appeared in films, including Mobile Home (2012), which earned her a Magritte Award for Most Promising Actress, The Brand New Testament (2015), and Tamara (2016).

On 13 December 2016, it was announced that Clairembourg would host the 7th Magritte Awards.

Filmography

References

External links

Living people
Belgian film actresses
Belgian stage actresses
Magritte Award winners
20th-century Belgian actresses
21st-century Belgian actresses
1975 births